"Until Grace" is a song performed by American Christian pop artist Tauren Wells and American country music group Rascal Flatts. It was released on February 14, 2020, as the third single from Wells' second studio album, Citizen of Heaven (2020). Wells co-wrote the song with Chuck Butler and Ethan Hulse.

"Until Grace" peaked at No. 11 on the US Hot Christian Songs chart.

Background
On February 14, 2020, Tauren Wells released "Until Grace" with Rascal Flatts as the third single from his second studio album, Citizen of Heaven on digital platforms. On April 5, 2021, the radio team of Provident Label Group announced that it will be serviced to Christian radio in the United States, the official add date for the single slated on April 30. On April 9, 2021, Wells released a live version featuring Gary LeVox of Rascal Flatts as a promotional single in the lead-up to the release of his first live album, Citizen of Heaven (Live) (2021).

Composition
The song is composed in the key of F-sharp major with a tempo of 145 beats per minute.

Commercial performance
Following the official release of "Until Grace" on Christian radio, the song debuted on the US Christian Airplay chart dated May 8, 2021, at number 46. The song debuted at No. 31 on the US Hot Christian Songs chart dated May 29, 2021.

Music videos
Tauren Wells released the official visualizer on January 24, 2020. On April 9, 2021, Wells released an official live performance video that shows Wells singing alongside Gary LeVox was filmed at Lakewood Church in Houston, Texas. On April 16, 2021, Wells released an audio video live version on YouTube. On April 23, 2021, Tauren Wells published an official lyric video YouTube.

Charts

Weekly charts

Year-end charts

Release history

References

External links

2020 songs
2020 singles
Tauren Wells songs
Rascal Flatts songs
Songs written by Tauren Wells
Songs written by Chuck Butler
Songs written by Ethan Hulse